In elections that use the single transferable vote (STV) method, quotas are used (a) for the determination of candidates considered elected; and (b) for the calculation of surplus votes to be redistributed. Two quotas in common use are the Hare quota and the Droop quota.  The largest remainder method of party-list proportional representation can also use Hare quotas or Droop quotas.

General comparison
The earliest versions of STV used the Hare quota. The Hare quota is equal to the total valid poll (V) divided by the total number of seats (n), or V / n. 

The Droop quota is generally smaller than the Hare quota, and was first suggested  because it is the smallest quota that, like the Hare quota, ensures that the number of candidates who reach the quota will not be greater than the number of seats to be filled. Any quota smaller than the Droop quota carries a real, or at least theoretical, risk of more candidates being elected than there are seats to be filled. The Droop quota is the next integer larger than V / (n+1).

The difference between the two quotas comes down to what the quota implies. Winners elected under a Hare system represent that proportion of the electorate; winners under a Droop system were elected by that proportion of the electorate.

In an STV election in which there is only one seat to be filled (in other words an Instant Run-off Voting election) it is possible to use the Hare quota, which will simply be equal to 100% of votes cast. However, it is more efficient to use the Droop quota, which will be equal to an absolute majority of votes cast, meaning 50% plus one, and both quotas will achieve the same result. When voters have only one vote—the single non-transferable vote system—a candidate is sure to win if reaching the Droop quota.

In an STV election in which there are multiple winners the situation is slightly different, particularly with respect to the final seat. 
The Hare quota is generally kinder to small parties than the Droop quota because they have a better chance to win the final seat. Elected winners with the Hare quota more closely represent the proportionality of the electorate, and this can mean more proportional results for small parties. But this comes at the expense of emphasising the principle of majority rule. In an open list election held under the Hare quota it is possible for a group of candidates supported by a majority of voters to receive only a minority of seats if those voters do not disperse their vote relatively evenly across all their supported candidates, see Scenario 1 below. In contrast, such an outcome will not happen in an election held under the Droop quota unless voters in the majority do not rank all their preferred candidates or not enough preferred candidates seek office.
The Droop quota is generally kinder to large parties because they have a better chance to win the final seat. This comes at the expense of emphasising the principle of proportional representation. In an election held under the Droop quota it is possible for a group of candidates to over-represent a proportion of voters even though a majority of the remaining voters support a minor party, see Scenario 2 below.  The Droop quota can leave nearly one quota's worth of votes held by unsuccessful candidates; these ballots are effectively ignored.  That is, relative to the Hare quota, ballots for the elected candidates with second-place preferences get the influence that would have gone to these ignored ballots.

The Droop quota is today the most popular quota for STV elections - and almost universal for government STV elections - for two reasons . First, because it can more efficiently elect candidates in the each round of distribution of seats (whether STV or list PR) than is the case with the Hare quota. Second, because the possibility under the Hare quota that a group of candidates supported by a majority of voters to receive only a minority of seats is considered undemocratic .

Examples of the different outcomes between the Hare and the Droop quotas follow:

Scenario 1
An example with STV where the result under the Droop quota more closely reflects the support that voters have for a party, irrespective of the support they have for individuals within the party.

Imagine an election in which there are 5 seats to be filled. There are 6 candidates divided between two groups: Andrea, Carter and Brad are members of the Alpha party; Delilah, Scott and Jennifer are members of the Beta party. There are 120 voters and they vote as follows:

Voters are voting for full slates. Supporters of the Alpha party all rank all three Alpha party candidates higher than any of the Beta party candidates. Similarly, voters who support the Beta party all give their first three preferences to Beta party candidates. The voters may not have indicated  4th, 5th and 6th preferences, but if they did or had to due to electoral rules, they are not shown above because they will not affect the result of the election.

Overall, the Alpha party receives 63 votes out of a total of 120 votes. The Alpha party therefore has a majority of about 53%. The Beta party receives a 47% share of the vote.

Below the election results are shown first under the Hare quota and then under the Droop quota. It can be seen that under the Hare quota, despite receiving 53% of the vote, the Alpha party receives only a minority of seats. When the same election is conducted under the Droop quota, however, the Alpha party's majority is rewarded with a majority of seats.

Count under the Hare quota
 The Hare quota is calculated as 120/5 = 24.
 When first preferences are tallied Andrea and Carter have both reached a quota and are declared elected. Andrea has a surplus of 7 and Carter has a surplus of 6. Both surpluses are transferred to Brad (the next relevant preference indicated on the ballots) so the tallies become:
Brad (Alpha party): 15
Delilah (Beta party): 20
Scott (Beta party): 19
Jennifer (Beta party): 18
 No candidate has reached a quota. Brad is the candidate with the fewest votes and so he is excluded. Because just three candidates remain and there are only three more seats to be filled, Delilah, Scott and Jennifer are all declared elected.
Result: The elected candidates are: Andrea and Carter (from the Alpha party), and Delilah, Scott and Jennifer (from the Beta party).

Count under the Droop quota
The Droop quota is calculated as 21 (the next number higher than 120/6).
When first preferences are tallied Andrea and Carter have reached the quota and, as before, are declared elected. Andrea has a surplus of 10 and Carter a surplus of 9. These surpluses transfer to Brad and the tallies become:
Brad (Alpha party): 21
Delilah (Beta party): 20
Scott (Beta party): 19
Jennifer (Beta party): 18
Brad has now reached a quota and is declared elected. He has no surplus so Jennifer, who this time has the fewest votes, is excluded. Because only Delilah and Scott are left in the count, and there are only two seats left to fill, they are both declared elected.
Result: The elected candidates are Andrea, Carter and Brad (from the Alpha party) and Delilah and Scott (from the Beta party).

Scenario 2
An example with a closed list  using the largest remainder method.

Imagine an election in which there are 3 seats to be filled. There are 5 candidates divided between 3 groups: Alex, Bobbie and Chris are members of the Alpha party; Jo is a member of the Beta party; and Kim is a member of the Gamma party. There are 99 voters and they vote as follows:

Count under the Hare quota
 The Hare quota is calculated as 33.
 When first preferences are tallied Alpha party has one full quota so Alex is declared elected. Alpha party has a surplus of 17.
Alpha Party (Bobbie and Chris) : 17
Beta Party (Jo): 25
Gamma Party (Kim): 24
 No candidate has reached a quota. Alpha is the party with the fewest votes and so Bobbie and Chris are excluded. Because just two candidates remain and there are only two more seats to be filled, Jo and Kim are declared elected.
Result: The elected candidates are: Alex (from the Alpha party), Jo (from the Beta party), and Kim (from the Gamma party).  The Alpha party won a majority of votes but did not win a majority of seats.

Count under the Droop quota
The Droop quota is calculated as 25.
When first preferences are tallied, Alpha party has two full quotas so Alex and Bobbie are declared elected, and Beta party has one full quota so Jo is declared elected.
With three candidates elected there are no more seats to fill.

Result: The elected candidates are Alex  and Bobbie (from the Alpha party) and Jo (from the Beta party). The Gamma party is excluded from representation despite getting 24% of the votes.

Scenario 3

October 2012 City of Melbourne, Australia Municipal Election
As a real life example of the implementation of the two quota systems and the impact it has on the outcome of the election results.

The City of Melbourne Council Elections were held in October 2012, under the rules of the largest remainder method, using the Droop quota, with 9 vacancies to be elected from 40 candidates representing 11 teams plus three independents.

For 9 seats, the Droop quota is 10% of votes, whilst the Hare quota is 11.11%.  63,664 votes were cast, so the Droop quota was 6,367, and the Hare quota was 7,074.  The following table shows the percentage of first-preference votes and number of quotas this represents, under each system.  To calculate the final result, further preferences must be taken into account as well.

Winning Candidates

Team Doyle (Headed by Melbourne Lord Mayor Robert Doyle) received 37.5% of first-preference votes.  Under both quotas, they elected three representatives, comprising 33.3% of the seats. 

The Greens, who received 15.1% of first-preference votes, elected two representatives under the Droop quota.  Under the Hare quota, they would have only elected a single candidate; while Kevin Chamberlin, who received 5.8% of first-preference votes, would have been elected instead.  The Greens did not have enough first-preference votes to directly elect two candidates (for either quota), and Shanahan Chamberlin For Melbourne did not have enough first-preference votes to directly elect one candidate (for either quota).

Under both quotas, surplus votes are reallocated as parties reach the quota.  Under the Droop quota, the second Green candidate (Rohan Leppert) had more votes after reallocation than either the first Chamberlin candidate or the fourth Doyle candidate.  In contrast, the Hare quota requires a larger number of votes to elect a candidate, which would reduce the number of votes for the Green and Doyle candidates, putting Kevin Chamberlin ahead.  We can see that for awarding the final seat, the Droop quota is more favorable to the larger Green party, while the Hare quota is more favorable to the smaller Chamberlin party.

Notes

See also
 List of democracy and elections-related topics

Electoral system quotas
Single transferable vote